Lake Elmer is a reservoir in Kingfisher County, Oklahoma that is owned by the Oklahoma Department of Wildlife Conservation. Constructed in 1962, it was completely drained in 1978 for deepening the shoreline and constructing fishing jetties. It was reimpounded and restocked with fish, after a fish kill in 1979. The latitude and longitude are 35.8798, -97.9878.

The lake has a boat ramp and two water wells. Fish species of interest to fishermen are Largemouth Bass, Bluegill Sunfish, Crappie and Catfish.

References 

Elmer
1962 establishments in Oklahoma
Geography of Kingfisher County, Oklahoma